Elbazduko Britayev (23 March 1881 – 25 September 1923) was an Ossetian author and playwright, considered the founder of Ossetian traditional theatre. Many phrases from his works have become proverbs, such as "Love does not follow the rules of wisdom", and the characters that he created are being increasingly re-used.

1881 births
1923 deaths
Ossetian writers
Writers from the Russian Empire
Dramatists and playwrights from the Russian Empire